The Frères Morvan (Breton language : "Ar Vreudeur Morvan" ), François (1923–2012), Henri (born 1931) and Yvon (1934–2022), are three brothers native of the village of Botcol, in the municipality of Saint-Nicodème (Côtes-d'Armor) and who founded a group of traditional singers in 1958, with the arrival of the first sound system.

Discography 
 1974 : Ar vreudeur Morvan 
 1999 : Les frères Morvan
 2009 : Un demi-siècle de kan ha diskan

Awards, nominations and honours
 Ordre des Arts et des Lettres
Officiers (2013)

References

External links 

 
 Myspace

Breton musicians
Breton-language singers
Living people
People from Côtes-d'Armor
Officiers of the Ordre des Arts et des Lettres
Year of birth missing (living people)